Automatik may refer to:

Automatik Text Reader
"Automatik" (song) by Livvi Franc
Automatik Entertainment, film production company 
Automatik, textile machinery company 1947–1992, now a division of Rieter
Automatik, Serbian record label Artistička radna akcija

See also
 Automatic (disambiguation)